The-Truth!!! is the only full-length live recording by American jazz trombonist Tommy Turk. Asterik Recordings released the album in 1977. The release is a concert recording taken in Nino's East, Pittsburgh on  23 June 1977.

Track listing

Personnel
Band
Flo Cassinelli – baritone saxophone, tenor saxophone
Harry Bush – bass
John Schmidt – drums
Reid Jaynes – electric piano
Tommy Turk – trombone

Production
Ralph Cominio – engineer
Dave O’Leary – engineer

References

1977 live albums
Live jazz albums
Jazz albums by American artists